Foshan Wong Fei-hung Memorial Hall (or Foshan Huang Feihong Memorial Hall) is a museum in memory of Wong Fei-hung.

Background
Located in Xinwen Street, Zumiao Road in the Chancheng District, Foshan City, north of the Foshan Ancestral Temple in Guangdong.

The completion ceremony for the Wong Fei-hung Memorial Hall was held on January14, 2001. Its architecture is imitation Qing Dynasty (16441911) style, and includes an exhibition hall, auditorium, martial arts hall, and martial arts courtyards. In the exhibition hall, apart from introducing Wong Fei-hung's life story, there is also a comprehensive display of a variety of literary, artistic works as well as thousands of cultural relics relating to Wong Fei-hung.

References

Museums in Foshan
Biographical museums in China